Mancy may refer to:

 Divination
 Mancy, Marne, a commune in France
 Mancy, Moselle, a village int the commune of Bettelainville in France

See also

 
 Mancey
 Mance (disambiguation)
 Nancy (disambiguation)